The Azores Plateau or Azores Platform is an oceanic plateau encompassing the Azores archipelago and the Azores Triple Junction in the North Atlantic Ocean. It was formed by the Azores hotspot 20 million years ago and is still associated with active volcanism.

References

Plateaus of the Atlantic Ocean
Mid-Atlantic Ridge
Hotspot volcanism
Large igneous provinces